The women's mass start race of the 2015 World Single Distance Speed Skating Championships was held on 15 February 2015.

Results
The race was started at 16:19.

References

Women's mass start
World